Escape from Noise is the fourth studio album by Negativland. It marked the band's first release on an established independent record label, SST Records. On the album, they continued to develop their experimental style, as well as incorporating elements of pop music with shorter tracks and more conventional melodies. "Christianity Is Stupid", a track featuring samples from the propaganda movie If Footmen Tire You, What Will Horses Do?, proved to be an enduring signature song: the band and the release gained widespread attention a year later due to a SST press release falsely implying that murderer David Brom had listened to the song before killing his family members.

Release
The original album came with a yellow bumper sticker with black letters reading "Car Bomb", and a booklet outlining the history of the band, along with photos of band members and reviews of previous releases. In the booklet, Crosley Bendix (Don Joyce) describes how Negativland's studio/apartment and recording equipment were destroyed in a two-alarm fire discovered by Negativland member Mark Hosler  at 11:50 pm late on "Friday the 13th of February, 1987".

The fire started in Smart Laundry, a dry cleaning business located at street level below Negativland's apartment, 10028 San Pablo Avenue in El Cerrito, California. When he saw flames leaping up past their kitchen window, Hosler yelled to his friend Tera Freedman in the next room to call 9-1-1 to notify the fire department. Hosler and Freedman collected the finished master tapes and artwork for Escape from Noise and quickly left the building, just as fire crews arrived. Cleaning solvents in the laundry accelerated the fire and caused extensive damage to the building before fire crews gained control. Afterward, the band grimly assessed the total destruction of the recording equipment and the materials from previous releases. Together, they traveled to Los Angeles to meet with SST executives and "reaffirm their album commitment".

In 1999, Seeland Records reissued the album in a new "un-remixed" edition, adding no bonus tracks and blowing up the photo on the LP to fill the entire CD front cover and the original LP cover's words from Bendix were moved into the booklet. A sticker was placed on the album, saying:

An old album from Negativland: Digitally exacto-remastered 33 rpm compact disc re-issue of Negativland's classic 1987 LP with no added bonus tracks of any kind!

Don't let the new cover design fool you – your audiophile friends might think that such classics as "Car Bomb" and "Christianity Is Stupid" sound crisper and cleaner on this newly un-remixed edition, but they're dead wrong! And even though there are no longer eleven time zones in the Soviet Union (and no Soviet Union, either) this re-release sounds exactly the same as the original. The only thing different is the sticker you are reading right now.

The original LP is still in print on SST Records, even though the band re-released the record in 1999 on Seeland.

In 1988, the group released a mock press release to suggest that the song "Christianity Is Stupid" was connected to murders by David Brom, and that the group was forced to cancel a planned tour in support of Escape from Noise. However, there were no connections with the murders, and the tour was cancelled only due to shortage of funds and free time. Their next album, Helter Stupid, made use of the event by sampling news reports of the controversy surrounding Negativland.

Track listing

 A hidden track is after "Endscape". It is performed on the No Other Possibility video compilation as "Fire Song".

Personnel
Mark Hosler: Singing, synthesizers, guitars, voice tapes, percussions, rhythm loops, bomb parts, David manipulation, tiny metal banjo, recorder, many other noises, mix
Don Joyce: Yelling, talking tapes, electric tympani, synthesizer, lyrics, singing, Booper bee, bomb parts and assembly, noises everywhere, mix
Chris Grigg: Drums, synthesizer, singing, computer & software, field recordings, mix
David Wills: Talking, shortwave, family tape, bomb parts, regular Booper
Richard Lyons: Singing, lyrics, voice

With contributions from
Ian Allen: Helicopter (on "Sycamore"), Rhythm Loop (on "Car Bomb"), Bell (on "Time Zones")
Jello Biafra c/o Dead Kennedys: Toilet Flushing (on "The Playboy Channel")
Das c/o Big City Orchestra: Voice Tapes (on "Quiet Please")
Dina Emerson: Wordless Vocals (on "You Don't Even Live Here")
Steve Fisk: Optigan and Voice Tapes (on "Michael Jackson")
Tera Freedman: Voice Tape (on "Backstage Pass")
Phil Freihofner: Bomb Parts (on "Car Bomb")
Ray Briem: radio talk show host (on "Time Zones")
Ed Markmann: Paid Voice
Fred Frith: Urban Drum and Halfspeed Violin (on "Michael Jackson")
Jerry Garcia c/o Grateful Dead: Mouth Sounds and Chimes (on "Backstage Pass")
Alexander Hacke c/o Einstürzende Neubauten: Metal Noises (on "Christianity Is Stupid")
Mickey Hart c/o Grateful Dead: Percussion and Processed Animals (on "Backstage Pass")
Tom Herman c/o Tripod Jimmie: Torture Guitars (on "Methods of Torture")
Henry Kaiser: Doublespeed Disco Guitars (on "Quiet Please")
Louisa Michaels c/o Step One Nursery School: Singing (on "Over the Hiccups")
Mark Mothersbaugh c/o Devo: Jazz Bass, Jimi Hendrix, E-cussion, Saxophone and Noises (on "The Playboy Channel")
The Residents Hoots and Clanging (on "You Don't Even Live Here")
Rev. Ivan Stang c/o The Church of the SubGenius: Larynx (on "Christianity Is Stupid")
Rand Weatherwax c/o CBS: Orchestra Hits and E-cussion (on "Quiet Please")
Rob Wortman c/o Kingshouse: Leaf blower (on "You Don't Even Live Here")

References

External links
Collection of reviews of Escape from Noise
[ Escape from Noise] at Allmusic

1987 albums
Negativland albums
Concept albums
Experimental music albums